The Georgia–Saint Vincent and the Grenadines relations refer to the bilateral relations between Georgia and Saint Vincent and the Grenadines.

Relations 
The diplomatic relations between Georgia and Saint Vincent and the Grenadines were established on 22 June 2010 in an attempt by the Georgian government to establish its influence in the Central American region to counter Russia's influence.

The establishment of the ties came less than a year after Maxim Gvindzhia, the Prime Minister of separatist Abkhazia, visited South America and hoped for the recognition of Abkhazia's independence from Georgia by a string of countries, including Saint Vincent and the Grenadines. However, the Kingstown government has consistently supported Georgia's territorial integrity, which was reflected during the meetings of Georgian Foreign Minister Maia Panjikidze with her Saint Vincentian counterpart in 2014 and of Georgian Prime Minister Giorgi Kvirikashvili with the Saint Vincentian Prime Minister Ralph Gonsalves in 2015 in New York.

In 2018, the Permanent Representative of Saint Vincent and the Grenadines to the United Nations visited Georgia to study the human rights situation among the internally displaced persons from Abkhazia and South Ossetia. Kingstown has voted in favor of the Georgia-sponsored UN resolution calling for the return of those IDPs to their homes in the separatist regions since 2011.

In 2015, a year after Tbilisi abolished the visa-free regime for international tourists, the Georgian Parliament voted to restore the visa-free regime with Saint Vincent and the Grenadines.

Diplomatic Mission 
Georgia is represented in Saint Vincent and the Grenadines by its embassy in Mexico City, Mexico. The currently-accredited ambassador of Georgia is Zurab Eristavi.

Saint Vincent and the Grenadines does not have a diplomatic mission accredited to Georgia.

See also 
 Foreign relations of Georgia
 Foreign relations of Saint Vincent and the Grenadines

References 

 

 
Saint Vincent and the Grenadines
Georgia
2010 establishments in Georgia (country)
2010 establishments in Saint Vincent and the Grenadines